In mathematics, a colossally abundant number (sometimes abbreviated as CA) is a natural number that, in a particular, rigorous sense, has many divisors. Formally, a number n is said to be colossally abundant if there is an ε > 0 such that for all k > 1,

where σ denotes the sum-of-divisors function. All colossally abundant numbers are also superabundant numbers, but the converse is not true.

The first 15 colossally abundant numbers, 2, 6, 12, 60, 120, 360, 2520, 5040, 55440, 720720, 1441440, 4324320, 21621600, 367567200, 6983776800  are also the first 15 superior highly composite numbers, but neither set is a subset of the other.

History

Colossally abundant numbers were first studied by Ramanujan and his findings were intended to be included in his 1915 paper on highly composite numbers.  Unfortunately, the publisher of the journal to which Ramanujan submitted his work, the London Mathematical Society, was in financial difficulties at the time and Ramanujan agreed to remove aspects of the work to reduce the cost of printing.  His findings were mostly conditional on the Riemann hypothesis and with this assumption he found upper and lower bounds for the size of colossally abundant numbers and proved that what would come to be known as Robin's inequality (see below) holds for all sufficiently large values of n.

The class of numbers was reconsidered in a slightly stronger form in a 1944 paper of Leonidas Alaoglu and Paul Erdős in which they tried to extend Ramanujan's results.

Properties

Colossally abundant numbers are one of several classes of integers that try to capture the notion of having many divisors.  For a positive integer n, the sum-of-divisors function σ(n) gives the sum of all those numbers that divide n, including 1 and n itself. Paul Bachmann showed that on average, σ(n) is around πn / 6. Grönwall's theorem, meanwhile, says that the maximal order of σ(n) is ever so slightly larger, specifically there is an increasing sequence of integers n such that for these integers σ(n) is roughly the same size as eγn log(log(n)), where γ is the Euler–Mascheroni constant.  Hence colossally abundant numbers capture the notion of having many divisors by requiring them to maximise, for some ε > 0, the value of the function

over all values of n.  Bachmann and Grönwall's results ensure that for every ε > 0 this function has a maximum and that as ε tends to zero these maxima will increase.  Thus there are infinitely many colossally abundant numbers, although they are rather sparse, with only 22 of them less than 1018.

Just like with superior highly composite numbers, an effective construction of the set of all colossally abundant numbers is given by the following monotonic mapping from the positive real numbers. Let

for any prime number p and positive real . Then

 is a colossally abundant number.

For every ε the above function has a maximum, but it is not obvious, and in fact not true, that for every ε this maximum value is unique.  Alaoglu and Erdős studied how many different values of n could give the same maximal value of the above function for a given value of ε.  They showed that for most values of ε there would be a single integer n maximising the function.  Later, however, Erdős and Jean-Louis Nicolas showed that for a certain set of discrete values of ε there could be two or four different values of n giving the same maximal value.

In their 1944 paper, Alaoglu and Erdős conjectured that the ratio of two consecutive colossally abundant numbers was always a prime number. They showed that this would follow from a special case of the four exponentials conjecture in transcendental number theory, specifically that for any two distinct prime numbers p and q, the only real numbers t for which both pt and qt are rational are the positive integers.  Using the corresponding result for three primes—a special case of the six exponentials theorem that Siegel claimed to have proven—they managed to show that the quotient of two consecutive colossally abundant numbers is always either a prime or a semiprime (that is, a number with just two prime factors). The quotient can never be the square of a prime.

Alaoglu and Erdős's conjecture remains open, although it has been checked up to at least 107.  If true it would mean that there was a sequence of non-distinct prime numbers p1, p2, p3,... such that the nth colossally abundant number was of the form

Assuming the conjecture holds, this sequence of primes begins 2, 3, 2, 5, 2, 3, 7, 2 .  Alaoglu and Erdős's conjecture would also mean that no value of ε gives four different integers n as maxima of the above function.

Relation to the Riemann hypothesis 
In the 1980s Guy Robin showed that the Riemann hypothesis is equivalent to the assertion that the following inequality is true for all n > 5040: (where γ is the Euler–Mascheroni constant)

This inequality is known to fail for 27 numbers :
2, 3, 4, 5, 6, 8, 9, 10, 12, 16, 18, 20, 24, 30, 36, 48, 60, 72, 84, 120, 180, 240, 360, 720, 840, 2520, 5040

Robin showed that if the Riemann hypothesis is true then n = 5040 is the last integer for which it fails.  The inequality is now known as Robin's inequality after his work.  It is known that Robin's inequality, if it ever fails to hold, will fail for a colossally abundant number n; thus the Riemann hypothesis is in fact equivalent to Robin's inequality holding for every colossally abundant number n > 5040.

In 2001–2 Lagarias demonstrated an alternate form of Robin's assertion which requires no exceptions, using the harmonic numbers instead of log:

Or, other than the 8 exceptions of n = 1, 2, 3, 4, 6, 12, 24, 60:

References

External links
Keith Briggs on colossally abundant numbers and the Riemann hypothesis
MathWorld entry
Notes on the Riemann hypothesis and abundant numbers
More on Robin's formulation of the RH

Divisor function
Integer sequences